Brian Christopher Miller (born August 20, 1995) is an American professional baseball outfielder in the Miami Marlins organization. He made his MLB debut in 2021.

Amateur career
Miller attended Millbrook High School in Raleigh, North Carolina. He committed to play college baseball for the University of North Carolina at Asheville, but decommitted when the school's coach was fired. He enrolled at the University of North Carolina at Chapel Hill and walked on to the North Carolina Tar Heels. In 2016, he played collegiate summer baseball with the Orleans Firebirds of the Cape Cod Baseball League, and was named a league all-star. In 2017, his junior year, he hit .343 with seven home runs and 49 RBIs in 63 games. The Miami Marlins selected Miller with the 36th overall selection of the 2017 MLB draft. Miller signed with the Marlins, receiving a $1,888,800 signing bonus.

Professional career

Miami Marlins
The Marlins assigned Miller to the Greensboro Grasshoppers where he posted a .322 batting average with one home run, 28 RBIs, and 21 stolen bases in 57 games. He began 2018 with the Jupiter Hammerheads, with whom he was named a Florida State League All-Star, before being promoted to the Jacksonville Jumbo Shrimp in June. In 128 games between both clubs, he batted .295/.338/.355 with 43 RBIs and forty stolen bases. He returned to Jacksonville for the 2019 season, earning Southern League All-Star honors. Over 120 games, Miller slashed .265/.326/.354 with two home runs, 39 RBIs, and 22 stolen bases. He did not play a minor league game in 2020 due to the cancellation of the minor league season caused by the COVID-19 pandemic. He opened the 2021 season with Jacksonville.

On July 30, 2021, Miami selected Miller's contract and promoted him to the major leagues. He made his MLB debut that night, hitting a single off New York Yankees Jameson Taillon. After the season, on November 19, 2021, Miller was designated for assignment to make room for pitcher Louis Head who the Marlins acquired in a trade from the Tampa Bay Rays.

References

External links

1995 births
Living people
Baseball players from Raleigh, North Carolina
Major League Baseball outfielders
Miami Marlins players
North Carolina Tar Heels baseball players
Orleans Firebirds players
Greensboro Grasshoppers players
Jupiter Hammerheads players
Jacksonville Jumbo Shrimp players
Salt River Rafters players